Hossein Bazaiari is an Iranian football defender who plays for Esteghlal Khuzestan in the Persian Gulf Pro League.

References

1994 births
Living people
Association football defenders
Esteghlal Khuzestan players
Iranian footballers
People from Bushehr
21st-century Iranian people